In mathematics, Giraud subcategories form an important class of subcategories of Grothendieck categories. They are named after Jean Giraud.

Definition 

Let  be a Grothendieck category. A full subcategory  is called reflective, if the inclusion functor  has a left adjoint. If this left adjoint of  also preserves 
kernels, then  is called a Giraud subcategory.

Properties 
Let  be Giraud in the Grothendieck category  and  the inclusion functor.
  is again a Grothendieck category.

See also 
 Localizing subcategory

References 

 Bo Stenström; 1975; Rings of quotients. Springer.

Category theory
Homological algebra